Dunhinda Falls is a waterfall located about  from Badulla in the lower central hills of Sri Lanka.   

The fall is created by the Badulu Oya which flows through Badulla.

See also
 List of waterfalls of Sri Lanka

References
 

Waterfalls of Sri Lanka
Landforms of Badulla District
Waterfalls in Uva Province